Sumbawa or Sumbawarese is a Malayo-Polynesian language of the western half of Sumbawa Island, Indonesia, which it shares with speakers of Bima. It is closely related to the languages of adjacent Lombok and Bali; indeed, it is the easternmost Austronesian language in the south of Indonesia that is not part of the Central Malayo-Polynesian Sprachbund. The Sumbawa write their language with their own native script commonly known in their homeland as Satera Jontal and they also use the Latin script.

Phonology

Consonants

Vowels 

References

Languages of Indonesia
Bali–Sasak–Sumbawa languages
Sumbawa